Virtual Magnifying Glass is an open-source, screen magnification tool for Microsoft Windows and Linux.

Virtual Magnifying Glass is designed for the visually impaired and others who need to magnify part of the computer display. Unlike most similar programs, it does not open a separate program window for the magnification but instead puts a movable magnifying glass on the screen.

Virtual Magnifying Glass  works on a variety of platforms (Windows, Linux, FreeBSD, Mac OS) due to being developed with the Free Pascal compiler. There is no charge for the software.

See also

 Screen magnifier

External links
 Virtual Magnifying Glass on SourceForge.net

References 

Screen magnifiers
Utilities for Windows